The Maria Reiche Neuman Airport  is a small airport serving Nazca, in the Ica Region of Peru.  The airport is named after Maria Reiche, a principal researcher and proponent of the Nazca Lines.

The airport receives a small number of domestic charter flights. The main use of the airport is for tourist flights over the Nazca Lines.

Airlines and destinations

Accidents and incidents
 On 10 June 2010, an AeroDiana Cessna 208 on a sightseeing flight over the Nazca Lines went missing. Authorities suspect that it was hijacked, as a number of occupants had false identities. The pilot and co-pilot later were found alive, but there has been no sign of the aircraft and remaining passengers since.

See also
Transport in Peru
List of airports in Peru

References

External links
 Google Earth satellite view
SkyVector - Nazca
OpenStreetMap - Nasca

Airports in Peru
Buildings and structures in Ica Region